The 11003 / 11004 Tutari Express (formerly Dadar Terminus–Sawantwadi Road Rajya Rani Express) is an express train belonging to Indian Railways – Central Railway zone that runs between Mumbai and Sawantwadi in Sindhudurg district of Maharashtra in India. It operates as train number 11003 from Dadar Terminus to Sawantwadi Road and as train number 11004 in the reverse direction.

As a sign of respect to revolutionary Marathi poet Krishnaji Keshav Damle, who wrote under the pen name 'Keshavsut', the railways has decided to rename the train Tutari Express on 22 May 2017, after the title of his famous Marathi poem "Tutari" which means a trumpet-like instrument in Marathi.

Coaches

The 11003/11004 Tutari Express presently has 1 AC 2 tier, 1 AC 3 tier, 7 Sleeper class & 4 Unreserved/General coaches.

As with most train services in India, coach composition may be amended at the discretion of Indian Railways depending on demand.

Service

The 11003 Tutari Express covers the distance of 497.8 kilometres in 10 hours 35 mins (47 km/hr) & in 11 hours 55 mins as 11004 Tutari Express (42 km/hr).

Route & Halts
 
 
 
  (Technical Halt) crew Change

Traction

As large sections of the route are yet to be electrified, it is diesel-hauled end to end. A WDM-3D / WDM-3A / WDP-4D engine from the Kalyan shed hauls the train for its entire journey.

Timetable

11003 Tutari Express leaves Dadar Terminus every day at 00:05 hrs IST and reaches Sawantwadi Road at 10:40 hrs IST the same day.

11004 Tutari Express leaves Sawantwadi Road every day at 18:50 hrs IST and reaches Dadar Terminus at 06:45 hrs IST the next day.

See also
 Rajya Rani Express
 List of named passenger trains in India

External links
http://www.cr.indianrailways.gov.in/view_detail.jsp?lang=0&dcd=161&id=0,4,268
http://indiarailinfo.com/train/15018?
http://indiarailinfo.com/train/15017?

References 

Transport in Mumbai
Transport in Sawantwadi
Railway services introduced in 2011
Rajya Rani Express trains
Rail transport in Maharashtra
2011 establishments in Maharashtra
Named passenger trains of India